The Solidarity Citizens' Committee (Komitet Obywatelski "Solidarność", KO "S"), also known as Citizens' Electoral Committee (Obywatelski Komitet Wyborczy) and previously named the Citizens' Committee with Lech Wałęsa (Komitet Obywatelski przy Lechu Wałęsie), was an initially semi-legal political organisation of the democratic opposition in Communist Poland.

Formed on 18 December 1988 in the premises of the Divine Mercy church in Warsaw, it spontaneously evolved into a nationwide movement attracting a vast majority of supporters of radical political change in the country after the conclusion of the Round Table talks (6 February–4 April 1989) and the announcement of semi-free general elections for 4 June that year.

The relaunched union weekly Tygodnik Solidarność, then edited by Tadeusz Mazowiecki; and the new Gazeta Wyborcza (today Poland's largest daily paper), edited by Adam Michnik and launched on 8 May 1989, became influential organs for the movement. Its name came from the independent union Solidarity.

History 
According to the Round Table Agreement, 35%, i.e. 161 out of 460 seats in the so-called "Contract Sejm" (Sejm kontraktowy), the lower house of the Polish parliament, were to be allocated by a free election. In the run-up to the election, the Citizens' Committee decided to nominate as many candidates in each constituency as there were seats democratically available. The Round Table Agreement also included the restoration of a less powerful upper house of parliament, the Senate, which had been abolished in 1946, to accommodate the opposition's demand for parliamentary representation. The new senate was to have 100 seats, all of which were to be allocated in a free election. The Citizens' Committee nominated a candidate for each seat.

In its campaigning, the Citizens' Committee relied on its "Electoral Paper" Gazeta Wyborcza, and election posters printed mostly unofficially by an extensive network of samizdat print shops, which had been operating throughout the 1980s. Every candidate had an article in Gazeta Wyborcza and posters showing them with the figurehead of the opposition, Wałęsa. There were other motifs too, most famously perhaps the minimalist "High Noon" poster billing the election as the ultimate showdown between the government and the people.

Held in two ballots on 4 and 18 June, the election resulted in a landslide victory of the opposition organised in the Citizens' Committee, which won all 161 seats available to it in the Sejm, and 99 out of 100 seats in the senate. The one remaining senate seat was won by independent candidate Henryk Stokłosa. The Committee's candidates won by a large margin in all constituencies, frequently receiving more than 90% of the votes.

Independent, non-Committee candidates obtained a total of 40% of all votes not cast for the ruling Polish United Workers' Party and its affiliates. Even in this historic "showdown" election, the turnout was merely 62% in the first and 26% in the second ballot and low turnouts have remained a problem in all Polish elections since.

On 25 August 1989, the new "Contract Sejm" elected the Civil Committee's candidate Tadeusz Mazowiecki as Prime Minister, making him the first ever non-Communist head of government east of the Iron Curtain whereas the presidency remained in the hands of the ruling party.

As the Committee was not a typical political party but a rather spontaneously formed, loose organisation to facilitate and focus the opposition's pre-election efforts, it did not survive its own triumph for long. On 23 June 1989, the Committee candidates which found themselves in the Sejm formed the Citizens' Parliamentary Party (Obywatelski Klub Parlamentarny, OKP), which elected Bronisław Geremek as chairman.

However, political frictions soon occurred within the OKP. Eventually, two rival factions emerged from the OKP and its political milieu, namely a more conservative and populist wing which formed the party Centre Agreement (Porozumienie Centrum, PC) on 12 May 1990 led by Lech Kaczyński whereas the more liberal, "intellectual" wing represented by Geremek went on to form their own party called Citizens' Movement for Democratic Action (Ruch Obywatelski Akcja Demokratyczna, ROAD) which later evolved into the Democratic Union (Unia Demokratyczna, UD), Freedom Union (Unia Wolności, UW) and most recently the Democratic Party (Partia Demokratyczna (PD), also known as demokraci.pl. The split between Solidarity's conservative and liberal heirs became evident in the 1990 presidential election, when the conservatives supported Wałęsa while the liberals nominated Mazowiecki as their own candidate. This cleavage continues to shape the Polish political landscape until this day.

Election Results

Sejm

Senate

References 

Defunct political parties in Poland
1988 establishments in Poland
Solidarity (Polish trade union)
Catholic political parties